Reineskarvet is a significant mountain in the municipality of Ål in Buskerud, Norway.

It is located in the Skarvheimen highland area  between Jotunheimen and Hardangervidda, on the north side of Hallingdalen, west of Hemsedal. Reineskarvet looks like Hallingskarvet  and lies parallel to it a bit farther north east. The highest point lies in the western end, while there is a summit in the eastern end with elevation 1732 m, popular for hiking.

Gallery

References

Mountains of Viken